York County is a county on the north central border in the U.S. state of South Carolina. As of the 2020 census, the population was 282,090, making it the seventh most populous county in the state. Its county seat is the city of York, and its largest city is Rock Hill. The county is served by one interstate highway, I-77.

York County is part of the Charlotte-Concord-Gastonia Metropolitan Statistical Area.

History

Pre-colonial and early colonial history
With a population of nearly 6,000 at the time of first European contact, the native inhabitants, the Catawba were primarily agriculturalists. Hernando de Soto passed through the area in the 1540s in his search for gold.  Several decades later Juan Pardo recorded his observation of a predominant Native American tribe, later confirmed to be the Catawba, in the vicinity of present-day Fort Mill, east of the Catawba River.

The Province of South Carolina was founded in 1670.  Twelve years later it was divided into three counties.  One of these, Craven County, roughly encompassed the northern half of the colony (including the southern half of present-day York County), while the northern portion of York County was considered part of North Carolina.

The first European settlers in the Carolina Piedmont, traditionally called the South Carolina Upcountry, were Scots-Irish Presbyterians.  They comprised the most numerous group of immigrants from the British Isles in the eighteenth century and the latest to arrive. Rising rent and land prices in western Pennsylvania drove them southward down the Great Wagon Road, and they began arriving in the Upcountry west of the Catawba River during the 1740s. They settled in present-day York County during the 1750s.

North Carolina's rule 
Before the boundaries between the two Carolinas were fixed, the northern portion of York County was part of Bladen County, North Carolina, and in 1750 it was included in the newly created Anson County, North Carolina (the first land grants and deeds for the region were issued in Anson). In 1762 Mecklenburg County, North Carolina, was formed from western Anson and included present-day northern York County. Five years later, the area became part of Tryon County, North Carolina, which comprised all of North Carolina west of the Catawba River and south of Rowan County. This area would remain a part of Tryon County until 1772, when the boundary between North and South Carolina in this portion was finally established.

18th century
After its transfer to South Carolina in 1772, much of the area was known as the New Acquisition. In 1785, York County was one of the original counties in the newly created state of South Carolina, and its boundaries remained unchanged until 1897, when a small portion of the northwestern corner (including the site of the Battle of Kings Mountain), was ceded to the newly formed Cherokee County, South Carolina.

By 1780, the Carolina Upcountry had an estimated population of more than 250,000, predominantly Scots-Irish Presbyterians but with significant numbers of other Protestants from Great Britain. The Scots-Irish settled in a dispersed community pattern denoted by communal, clannish, family-related groups known as "clachans", much the same as in Pennsylvania and Ulster, Northern Ireland. The clachans developed around the Presbyterian Kirks, or meetinghouses, and became the forerunners of the congregations. In York County, the "Five B" churches, all Presbyterian—- Bethany, Bethel, Bethesda, Beersheba and Bullock's Creek—- are the county's oldest.

Sandwiched between unfriendly natives to the west, Cherokee, Shawnee and Creek Native American tribes, and indifference on the part of English officials in Charleston, who considered residents of the Backcountry uncivilized, the early settlers frequently found themselves targets of Native American raids, and the local militia became an early police force, patrolling the area for possible Native American or slave troubles and controlling the seemingly numerous outlaw bands which roamed the region. Militia units, or "Beat Companies", enrolled every able-bodied man on the frontier.

Residents of the Upcountry were initially slow to take sides in the American Revolutionary War, content to remain neutral as long as left unmolested; the conflict was initially viewed as one between the British Crown and Charleston plutocrats. The New Acquisition entered into vocal opposition to Royal authority in 1780 only after three "invasions" of the region: the first by Banastre Tarleton and his "Green Dragoons", and two more by Lord Cornwallis. Most of the state had capitulated to the British after their capture of Charleston, but after the Waxhaw massacre in nearby Lancaster County in May 1780, residents of the New Acquisition took part in a regional resistance.  Led by men such as William "Billy" Hill, William Bratton, and Samuel Watson, both the battles of Huck's Defeat and Kings Mountain, were fought in the New Acquisition.  These defeats forced Cornwallis northward, and led to his ultimate surrender at Yorktown.

After the defeat of the British, Upcountry residents enjoyed a greater share of administration in their region.  The area experienced phenomenal growth after the war.  In first United States census (1790), York County had a population of 6,604; 923 were listed as slaves, with a quarter of the county's slaves belonging to just nine men.  Less than 15% of the county's population lived in bondage in 1790, while the state averaged 30%.

A county seat was laid out in 1786 at Fergus' Cross Roads, where several roads converged near the geographic center of the county.  The new town was first known as the village of York, or more commonly York Court House.  In 1841, the town was incorporated as "Yorkville."  In 1823 its population (as recorded by local architect, Robert Mills), was 441—which included 292 whites and 149 blacks.  By 1840 the population had reached 600, and in 1850 Yorkville consisted of 93 dwellings and 617 inhabitants.  In the years just prior to the Civil War, the town gained a reputation as a summer resort for many Lowcountry planters trying to escape the malarial swamps of the region for the more moderate climate to be found in the Upstate.  By 1860, the population of the town had topped 1,300—an increase of more than 125% in only one decade.  During the Civil War, the town became a focal point for residents from the Lowcountry as a refugee destination during Union occupation of their towns.

19th century

Early 19th century through Civil War
With the introduction of the cotton gin in the 1790s, the county's economic prospects increased as the importance of "King Cotton" grew, and slavery became an integral part of the economy. In 1800, 25% of all white families in the Upcountry owned slaves, but by 1820 nearly 40% were slaveholders.  Slave ownership increased significantly in York County between 1800 and 1860, though most slaves worked on small and medium-sized farms rather than larger plantations.  In 1800, whites made up 82.10% of the total population in York County, but by 1860 the white percentage of the total population had dropped to 62.50%. Figures from 1860 reveal slave holdings in York County were relatively small, with approximately 70% of all farms holding fewer than 10 slaves and less than 3% of the farms with 50 or more.

The proportion of York District farms in 1860 was:
 Less than : 20%
 51 to 100 acres (0.2 to ): 23.9%
 101 to 500 acres (0.4 to ): 53.9%
 More than : 2.7%

In 1810 the York District had increased in population to more than 10,000, of which over 3,000 were slaves.  By 1850, York District included 15,000 residents, over 40% of whom were slaves.  On the eve of the Civil War, the county's population had grown to approximately 21,500, with almost 1/2 of the population enslaved labor.  York County was heavily tied to agriculture, with 93% of the work force involved in raising crops in 1850, while the rest of the United States averaged a 78% agricultural work force.

In 1825 only three post offices operated in all of York County, at Yorkville, Blairsville and Hopewell, but by 1852 York District had 27.  The county's first newspaper, The Yorkville Pioneer, was established in 1823 (it ran for little more than a year), and was followed by several other attempts, until The Yorkville Enquirer was first published in 1855 (and which remains in publication today).

Chartered in 1848, the Kings Mountain Railroad Company began construction of a connecting line between Yorkville and the Charlotte and South Carolina Railway at Chester (completed in 1852). Rock Hill, located along the Charlotte and South Carolina route, rapidly developed as a transportation center in eastern York County, boasting 100 residents in 1860.

More than a dozen academies were operating in the county at the outbreak of the Civil War. The most famous was the Kings Mountain Military Academy in Yorkville, founded in 1854 by Micah Jenkins and Asbury Coward.

On the eve of the Civil War, York District was one of the more populated districts in Upstate South Carolina. There were 14 infantry companies formed in York County after war was declared. Of the 4,379 soldiers enlisted from York County, 805 died and many more were wounded. Only one minor battle was fought in the York District, the battle for the Catawba Bridge at Nations Ford in 1865.

Late 19th century
Between 1868 and 1871, York County became a hotbed of Ku Klux Klan attacks on African Americans. The Klan had an estimated 2,000 members in the county in 1871. Among their activities was the lynching of Jim Williams on March 6, 1871, led by Dr. J. Rufus Bratton. K Troop of the 7th Cavalry Regiment was charged with suppressing them. To escape the violence, in November 1871, a large group of local blacks, led by Rev. Elias Hill, a crippled anti-Klan activist beaten by Klansmen, emigrated to Liberia. York is believed by some to be the setting for Thomas F. Dixon, Jr.'s novel The Clansman: A Historical Romance of the Ku Klux Klan, later made into the motion picture "The Birth of a Nation", and Bratton is said to have been the inspiration for one of its characters.

During Reconstruction many of York County's larger property owners were forced to sell off portions of their land to smaller farmers.  The size of the average farm in York County dropped considerably while the number of small farming operations increased.  Late-19th century agriculture in York County was characterized by relatively small farm operations and an ignorance of soil qualities and the benefits of diversification, which eventually led to the agricultural difficulties of the 1890s, 1920s, and 1930s.

Railroad development continued in York County after the war's end, and in 1880 the Rock Hill Cotton Factory, the first steam-powered cotton factory in South Carolina, ushered in a new era of agricultural expansion and industrial development.  The Rock Hill Buggy Company, founded by John Gary Anderson, eventually grew to become the Anderson Motor Company, the first automobile manufacturing facility in the South.  Concurrently, Rock Hill's population increased from 809 to over 5,500 from 1880 to 1895.

20th century
Cotton production remained the dominant agriculture export in early 20th century York County, with the textile industry continuing to develop. Rock Hill became the hub of this industry, while mills blossomed throughout the county. South Carolina's peak cotton crop was harvested in 1921, and thereafter, cotton production began a long and steady decline, due in part to boll weevil infestations, soil erosion, and mechanization of farming technologies. The New Deal programs of the 1930s prodded farmers into switching to different crops, with cotton gradually becoming less and less the focal point of the county's economy.

In 1904 the Catawba Dam and Power Plant was completed, and Lake Wylie was created. The Catawba Power Company had been founded in 1899 by William C. Whitner, Dr. Gill Wylie, and Robert Wylie. Construction began in 1900 and when finally completed, the dam and power plant were one of the most important engineering accomplishments in the southeastern United States. The venture eventually led to the formation of Duke Power Company, and a later series of dams and hydroelectric facilities were built on the Catawba in both North and South Carolina.  The Catawba Power Plant sparked the industrialization of the Catawba Valley; by 1911 more than a million textile spindles were powered by it.

Geography and climate

York County is located in north central South Carolina, along the North Carolina border. Its natural boundaries are the Broad River on the west and the Catawba River on the east. All of York County is within the piedmont region. Although heavily wooded in many rural areas and retaining a predominantly rural character in its western sector, York County is part of the greater Charlotte metropolitan region and includes Rock Hill, the county's largest city, as well as the smaller cities of Tega Cay and York and the smaller towns of Clover, Fort Mill, Hickory Grove, McConnells, Sharon, and Lake Wylie.

According to United States Environmental Protection Agency (EPA) records, the mine is listed as a Superfund Alternative Site for acid mine drainage and groundwater contamination.

Climate
 
York County has a humid subtropical climate, characterized by hot, humid summers and cool, dry winters. Precipitation does not vary greatly between seasons. The coldest month of the year is January, when the average high temperature is around 53 °F (12 °C) and the average low temperature bottoms out at 33 °F (1 °C). The warmest temperature ever recorded in York County was in Rock Hill, was 106 °F (42 °C), on August 21, 1983, and the coldest temperature ever recorded was also in Rock Hill at −6 °F (−21 °C), on January 21, 1985.

Mountains
 Henry's Knob
 Joe's Mountain
 King's Mountain
 Nanny Mountain

Major water bodies 
 Broad River
 Catawba River
 Lake Wylie

National Protected areas

 Kings Mountain National Military Park (part)
 Historic Brattonsville

State and local protected areas/sites 
 Anne Springs Close Greenway - Adventure Road/Lake Haigler
 Brattonsville Historic District
 Draper Wildlife Management Area
 James Ross Wildlife Reservation
 Kings Mountain State Park
 Museum of York County

Adjacent counties
A border county separating North Carolina and South Carolina, York County shares boundaries with the following counties in both states:
 Gaston County, North Carolina – north
 Mecklenburg County, North Carolina – northeast
 Lancaster County – east
 Chester County – south
 Union County – southwest
 Cherokee County – west
 Cleveland County, North Carolina – northwest

Major highways

Major infrastructure 
 Rock Hill/York County Airport

Demographics

2020 census

As of the 2020 United States census, there were 282,090 people, 108,400 households, and 74,041 families residing in the county.

2010 census
As of the 2010 United States Census, there were 226,073 people, 85,864 households, and 61,089 families residing in the county. The racial makeup of the county was 74.8% white, 19.0% black or African American, 1.5% Asian, 0.9% American Indian, 0.1% Pacific islander, 1.9% from other races, and 1.8% from two or more races. Those of Hispanic or Latino origin made up 4.5% of the population. In terms of ancestry, 14.0% were German, 12.3% were Irish, 10.2% were English, 9.2% were American, and 6.0% were Scotch-Irish.

Of the 85,864 households, 36.8% had children under the age of 18 living with them, 52.6% were married couples living together, 13.9% had a female householder with no husband present, 28.9% were non-families, and 23.5% of all households were made up of individuals. The average household size was 2.59 and the average family size was 3.06. The median age was 37.2 years.

The median income for a household in the county was $51,925 and the median income for a family was $65,188. Males had a median income of $47,017 versus $34,096 for females. The per capita income for the county was $25,707. About 9.4% of families and 12.5% of the population were below the poverty line, including 17.5% of those under age 18 and 8.6% of those age 65 or over.

2000 census
As of the census of 2000, there were 164,614 people, 61,051 households, and 44,933 families residing in the county. The population density was 241 people per square mile (93/km2). There were 66,061 housing units at an average density of 97 per square mile (37/km2). The racial makeup of the county was 77.25% White, 19.16% Black or African American, 0.85% Native American, 0.89% Asian, 0.02% Pacific Islander, 0.93% from other races, and 0.91% from two or more races. 1.96% of the population were Hispanic or Latino of any race. 20.9% were of American, 8.8% Irish, 8.8% German, 8.8% English and 7.2% Scotch-Irish ancestry according to Census 2000.

There were 61,051 households, out of which 35.40% had children under the age of 18 living with them, 56.10% were married couples living together, 13.30% had a female householder with no husband present, and 26.40% were non-families. 21.30% of all households were made up of individuals, and 6.90% had someone living alone who was 65 years of age or older. The average household size was 2.63 and the average family size was 3.05.

In the county, the population was spread out, with 26.30% under the age of 18, 9.50% from 18 to 24, 31.10% from 25 to 44, 22.80% from 45 to 64, and 10.40% who were 65 years of age or older. The median age was 35 years. For every 100 females there were 94.00 males. For every 100 females age 18 and over, there were 90.20 males.

The median income for a household in the county was $44,539, and the median income for a family was $51,815. Males had a median income of $36,713 versus $24,857 for females. The per capita income for the county was $20,536. About 7.30% of families and 10.00% of the population were below the poverty line, including 12.10% of those under age 18 and 9.60% of those age 65 or over.

Law and government

Law enforcement
In 2014, a York County Sheriff's deputy shot an unarmed 70-year-old man after the deputy mistook his cane for a rifle. The deputy was found to have acted appropriately.

Politics 
In 2020 Joe Biden received 41.0 percent of the vote. This was the best result for a Democrat since 1980 when Jimmy Carter received 50.2 percent of the vote and won York County.

Education

York County has four public school districts. District One serves central and western York County, including the town of York; District Two serves northern York County and the town of Clover; District Three serves the City of Rock Hill and southern York County; District Four serves eastern York County and the town of Fort Mill.  York County is the home of York Technical College, Clinton College, and Winthrop University, all located in Rock Hill.

Communities

Cities
 Rock Hill (largest city)
 Tega Cay
 York (county seat)

Towns
 Clover
 Fort Mill
 Hickory Grove
 McConnells
 Sharon
 Smyrna (partly in Cherokee County)

Census-designated places
 Baxter Village
 Catawba
 India Hook (mostly annexed into the city of Rock Hill)
 Lake Wylie
 Lesslie
 Newport (mostly annexed into the city of Rock Hill)
 Riverview

Other unincorporated communities
 Bethany
 Bethel
 Blairsville
 Bowling Green
 Bullock Creek
 Filbert
 Holy Islamville
 Hopewell
 Ogden
 Red River
 Smith
 Tirzah

Former places
 Balloon, former community
 Ebenezer, former town
 Oakdale, former community

See also
 List of counties in South Carolina
 National Register of Historic Places listings in York County, South Carolina
 South Carolina state parks
 National Park Service

References

Further reading

External links

 
 
 York County Regional Chamber of Commerce

 
1785 establishments in South Carolina
Populated places established in 1785
Charlotte metropolitan area